In mathematics, the Weierstrass elliptic functions are elliptic functions that take a particularly simple form. They are named for Karl Weierstrass. This class of functions are also referred to as ℘-functions and they are usually denoted by the symbol ℘, a uniquely fancy script p. They play an important role in the theory of elliptic functions. A ℘-function together with its derivative can be used to parameterize elliptic curves and they generate the field of elliptic functions with respect to a given period lattice. 
Symbol for Weierstrass -function

Definition

Then the -function is defined as follows:

Oftentimes instead of  only  is written.

The Weierstrass -function is constructed exactly in such a way that it has a pole of the order two at each lattice point.

Because the sum  alone would not converge it is necessary to add the term .

Motivation 
Yet one still wants to find a way to parameterize it.

For the quadric , the unit circle, there exists a (non-rational) parameterization using the sine function and its derivative the cosine function:

Because of the periodicity of the sine and cosine  is chosen to be the domain, so the function is bijective.

This parameterization has the domain , which is topologically equivalent to a torus.

There is another analogy to the trigonometric functions. Consider the integral function

It can be simplified by substituting  and :

That means . So the sine function is an inverse function of an integral function.

Elliptic functions are also inverse functions of integral functions, namely of elliptic integrals. In particular the -function is obtained in the following way:

Let

Then  can be extended to the complex plane and this extension equals the -function.

Properties 
 ℘ is an even function. That means  for all , which can be seen in the following way:  The second last equality holds because . Since the sum converges absolutely this rearrangement does not change the limit.
 ℘ is meromorphic and its derivative is 
This means: 

Functions which are meromorphic and doubly periodic are also called elliptic functions.

Laurent expansion 
Let . Then for  the -function has the following Laurent expansion

where

Differential equation
Then the -function satisfies the differential equation

This yields an entire elliptic function that has to be constant by Liouville's theorem.

Invariants

The coefficients of the above differential equation g2 and g3 are known as the invariants.

The series expansion suggests that g2 and g3 are homogeneous functions of degree −4 and −6. That is

Let . One has:

That means g2 and g3 are only scaled by doing this. Set
 and 

where

Modular discriminant

The modular discriminant Δ is defined as the discriminant of the polynomial on the right-hand side of the above differential equation:

The discriminant is a modular form of weight 12. That is, under the action of the modular group, it transforms as

where  with ad − bc = 1.

Note that  where  is the Dedekind eta function.

The constants e1, e2 and e3

They are pairwise distinct and only depend on the lattice  and not on its generators.

Because those roots are distinct the discriminant  does not vanish on the upper half plane. Now we can rewrite the differential equation:

The invariants  and  can be expressed in terms of these constants in the following way:

Relation to Jacobi's elliptic functions

For numerical work, it is often convenient to calculate the Weierstrass elliptic function in terms of Jacobi's elliptic functions.

The basic relations are:

and their argument w equals

Relation to Jacobi's theta functions 
The function  can be represented by Jacobi's theta functions:

This also provides a very rapid algorithm for computing .

Relation to elliptic curves 
Consider the projective cubic curve

For this cubic, also called Weierstrass cubic, there exists no rational parameterization, if . In this case it is also called an elliptic curve. Nevertheless there is a parameterization that uses the -function and its derivative :

Now the map  is bijective and parameterizes the elliptic curve .

 is an abelian group and a topological space, equipped with the quotient topology.

It can be shown that every Weierstrass cubic is given in such a way. That is to say that for every pair  with  there exists a lattice , such that

This is an important theorem in number theory. It was part of Andrew Wiles' proof (1995) of Fermat's Last Theorem.

Addition theorems
Let , so that . Then one has:

As well as the duplication formula:

These formulas also have a geometric interpretation, if one looks at the elliptic curve  together with the mapping  as in the previous section.

The group structure of  translates to the curve and can be geometrically interpreted there:

This is equivalent to:

Typography 
The Weierstrass's elliptic function is usually written with a rather special, lower case script letter ℘.

In computing, the letter ℘ is available as \wp in TeX. In HTML, it can be escaped as &weierp;.

See also 

 Weierstrass functions
 Jacobi elliptic functions
 Lemniscate elliptic functions

Footnotes

References 

 N. I. Akhiezer, Elements of the Theory of Elliptic Functions, (1970) Moscow, translated into English as AMS Translations of Mathematical Monographs Volume 79 (1990) AMS, Rhode Island 
 Tom M. Apostol, Modular Functions and Dirichlet Series in Number Theory, Second Edition (1990), Springer, New York  (See chapter 1.)
 K. Chandrasekharan, Elliptic functions (1980), Springer-Verlag 
 Konrad Knopp, Funktionentheorie II (1947), Dover Publications; Republished in English translation as Theory of Functions (1996), Dover Publications 
 Serge Lang, Elliptic Functions (1973), Addison-Wesley, 
 E. T. Whittaker and G. N. Watson,  A Course of Modern Analysis, Cambridge University Press, 1952, chapters 20 and 21

External links

 
 Weierstrass's elliptic functions on Mathworld.
 Chapter 23, Weierstrass Elliptic and Modular Functions in DLMF (Digital Library of Mathematical Functions) by W. P. Reinhardt and P. L. Walker.
 Weierstrass P function and its derivative implemented in C by David Dumas
Modular forms
Algebraic curves
Elliptic functions